Milada may refer to:

Milada (name), a feminine given name
Milada (fly), a genus of fly of the family Tachinidae
Milada (film), a 2017 Czech biographical film
Lake Milada, a lake in the Ústí nad Labem Region of the Czech Republic
Squat Milada a social centre (evicted) in Prague